Genexus is the ninth studio album by American heavy metal band Fear Factory, released on August 7, 2015. It is the third Fear Factory album since guitarist Dino Cazares rejoined the band in 2009, their first album to feature drummer Mike Heller, and the final album they released with vocalist Burton C. Bell before his departure from the band in 2020, although his vocals appear on the band's next album, Aggression Continuum, which was initially recorded in 2017 but not released until four years later. Genexus is also Fear Factory's first release through Nuclear Blast. Upon its release, the album received positive reviews from critics.

A lyric video for the song "Soul Hacker" was released on June 17. A lyric video for the song "Protomech" was released on July 11. A full music video for the song "Dielectric" was released on August 7, the same day as the album release, and a music video for "Expiration Date" was released on April 12, 2016.

Sound and production
Regarding the drums on Genexus, Burton C. Bell stated: "...This time we are gonna use a live drummer, we're gonna use Mike Heller to record a few of the songs, not all of them, but a few to get that live feel, because some of these songs require a live feel, and so we're gonna go with that."

Like its predecessor The Industrialist and the (at the time) 20-year-old Demanufacture, Genexus is a concept album. The themes in the album include war, climate change, religion, and mortality.

Reception 

Genexus received a positive response by critics, praising the album for its brutal and abrasive sound. Ray Van Horn Jr. of Blabbermouth.net said that "the key and industrial supplements gives Genexus a busier and heartier personality, lighting up the album's prospectus of mankind transitioning toward a more mechanized state of being." Trey Spencer of Sputnik Music surmised that "this album is more melodic and accessible, Dino Cazares and Burton C. Bell prove that they still have what it takes to make a visceral Fear Factory album." James Christopher Monger of AllMusic commented that "more melody-driven than prior outings, Genexus nevertheless retains the band's penchant for pairing bleak science fiction imagery with piston-like, palm-muted guitar riffs and explosive percussion."

Touring 
Between the end of August and the middle of September in 2015, the ensemble had toured the Southern, Midwestern and Southwestern United States along with Once Human, Los Angeles metal band Before the Mourning and Chicago rock/metal band The Bloodline.

Track listing

Personnel 

 Burton C. Bell – vocals
 Dino Cazares – guitars, bass
 Mike Heller – drums (1-3, 5–9)

Additional personnel
 Fear Factory – production
 Drew Fulk – vocal production
 Mike Plotnikoff – drum engineering
 Matt Jefferson – Castronovo's drum engineering & editing
 Andy Sneap – mixing, mastering
 Anthony Clarkson – artwork, layout
 Geoff Bisente – additional vocal recording & editing
 Rhys Fulber – programming, keyboards (3, 4, 6, 8–12), co-production, manipulation,  vocal recording
 Damien Rainaud – additional keyboards & programming, engineering, editing, pre-production, pre-production mixing, vocals recording
 Giuseppe "Dualized" Bassi – additional keyboards, sampling & programming
 Laurent Tardy – piano (1 & 5)
 Sam "Mister Sam" Shearon – spoken word (1 & 10)
 Deen Castronovo – drums (4)
 Al Jourgensen – remix (11)

Charts

References 

Fear Factory albums
2015 albums
Concept albums
Nuclear Blast albums
Albums produced by Rhys Fulber